The Arulmigu Muthu Mariamman Temple is located in Vedigoundan kottai in Krishnagiri district, Tamil Nadu, India. The festival of this temple is held at Tamil month of chitterai every year. Celebrate this famous festival at three days. It is located 25 km away from Dharmapuri and Krishnagiri, 15 km from Kaveripattinam and 5 km from Karimangalam.

Hindu temples in Krishnagiri district